Claire Maxwell (born 10 August 1988), also known as Claire Brownie, is a Scotland netball international. She captained Scotland at both the 2018 Commonwealth Games and the 2019 Netball World Cup. She also represented Scotland at the 2014 Commonwealth Games and the 2015 Netball World Cup. At club level, she has played for Glasgow Wildcats, Team Bath and Sirens in the Netball Superleague and for Team Northumbria and Loughborough Lightning in the British Fast5 Netball All-Stars Championship.

Early life and education
Maxwell is originally from Turriff, Aberdeenshire. She was educated at Turriff Academy and the University of Edinburgh. In 2009 she graduated from Edinburgh with a  BEd in Physical Education.

Playing career

Netball Superleague
Glasgow Wildcats
Between 2008 and 2011 Maxwell played for Glasgow Wildcats.

Team Bath
Between 2014 and 2016 Maxwell played for Team Bath.
Sirens
On 21 February 2017 Maxwell captained Sirens as they made their Netball Superleague debut at the Emirates Arena in a 43–57 defeat against fellow newcomers Wasps. She continued to play for Sirens during the 2018 and 2019 seasons.

Fast5
In 2017 Maxwell played for Team Northumbria in the British Fast5 Netball All-Stars Championship. In 2019 she was a member of the Loughborough Lightning team that won the championship.

Scotland
Maxwell made her senior debut for Scotland in 2009. She previously represented Scotland at under-19, under-21 and university levels. She subsequently represented Scotland at the 2014 Commonwealth Games and 2015 Netball World Cup. She captained Scotland at both the 2018 Commonwealth Games and at the 2019 Netball World Cup. On 14 July 2019 Maxwell made her 100th senior appearance for Scotland in a 2019 Netball World Cup match against Uganda.

Teacher
Maxwell works as a PE teacher. She has worked at several schools,  including Hamilton Grammar School, Royal High School, Bath and Hamilton College.

Honours
Loughborough Lightning
British Fast5 Netball All-Stars Championship
Winners: 2019

References

External links
 

1988 births
Living people
Scottish netball players
Netball players at the 2014 Commonwealth Games
Netball players at the 2018 Commonwealth Games
Commonwealth Games competitors for Scotland
2015 Netball World Cup players
2019 Netball World Cup players
Netball Superleague players
Team Bath netball players
Sirens Netball players
Loughborough Lightning netball players
Team Northumbria netball players
People educated at Turriff Academy
Alumni of the University of Edinburgh
Scottish schoolteachers
Sportspeople from Aberdeenshire